Comunidade Intermunicipal do Oeste ( or ; in English: Intermunicipal Community of the West) is an administrative division of Portugal, located on the country's western central coast. Caldas da Rainha serves as the seat of Oeste.

The law establishing the framework for intermunicipal communities and metropolitan areas was approved by the Assembly of the Republic (Assembleia da República) on 27 August 2008. On 25 November 2008, the Associação de Municípios do Oeste (Association of Municipalities of the West), by the approval of the municipal assemblies (assembleias municipais) of each of its constituent municipalities, converted itself into the Comunidade Intermunicipal do Oeste. The law formally establishing the names, borders, and duties of the intermunicipal communities and metropolitan areas was approved by the Assembly of the Republic on 12 September 2013.

Oeste is the successor to Associação de Municípios do Oeste (Association of Municipalities of the West) and Comunidade Urbana do Oeste (Urban Community of the West; abbreviated ComUrb Oeste), which had been instituted on 29 March 2004.

Oeste is coterminous with the statistical NUTS 3 subregion Oeste within the NUTS II Centro Region. It is a region famous for its fruits and vegetables production, namely the famous pêra rocha variety.

Municipalities

Comunidade Intermunicipal do Oeste is made up of twelve municipalities:

References

External links

Comunidade Intermunicipal do Oeste
Jornal Oeste Online — online newspaper
Oeste Diário — regional portal
OESTE.TV // Vídeo — online "television" channel
Portal Oeste Digital — portal operated by Associação de Municípios do Oeste
Região de Turismo do Oeste — regional tourism authority

Oeste
Centro Region, Portugal